Lazare Kaplan International Inc. (LKI) is a diamond manufacturing and distribution company based in New York City. The Chairman of the Board of Directors is Maurice Tempelsman. LKI was founded in 1903 where it operated until it was moved to Caguas, Puerto Rico in the 1970s.

Business activities 

LKI's main business activity is cutting and polishing "ideal-cut" and "fine make" diamonds, which it sells to upscale retail jewelers throughout the world. Some of these diamonds are distributed loose while others are set in jewelry under the Lazare Diamond  brand. LKI distributes its products through over 1,500 retail partners and customers in 29 countries.

Although primarily based in the United States, LKI also has sales offices in Belgium, Japan, China and Hong Kong. LKI has operated in Japan since 1973, Southeast Asia since 1987 and Latin America since 1997.

LKI's first factory was located in Ponce, Puerto Rico. It became the largest diamond cutting and polishing factory in the United States. The company also has manufacturing operations in other parts of the world. It established a joint manufacturing partnership with Alrosa (the Russian government-owned mining company), with cutting facilities in Moscow and Barnaul. In addition, it has contract manufacturing operations in China and Thailand. In Africa, LKI has manufacturing facilities in Botswana and a joint manufacturing and technical services agreement with NamGem Diamond Manufacturing Company (Pty) Ltd in Namibia.

Company history 
LKI was founded in 1903 by Mr Lazare Kaplan. The Tempelsman Group purchased a controlling interest in LKI in 1984. LKI has been publicly listed since 1972 and remains the only company specialising in diamond manufacturing whose shares are publicly listed on a US stock exchange (American Stock Exchange; stock symbol: LKI). It has been a Diamond Trading Company (DTC) Sightholder since 1946. In 1985, it became the first company to launch a branded diamond (the Lazare Diamond).

Technical innovation 
In 1919, Lazare Kaplan's cousin, mathematician Marcel Tolkowsky, first published the mathematical formula for diamonds cut to "ideal" proportions, a formula designed to optimise the brilliance, fire and sparkle in a polished diamond. In the same year, LKI became the first commercial-scale operation to cut its diamonds to ideal proportions. In 1957, LKI developed the modern oval cut, and in 1983 it developed and patented the laser inscription process. In 2002, LKI was awarded a patent, jointly with the General Electric Company, for the high-pressure high-temperature (HPHT) process for improving the color of certain all-natural diamond types. In addition, LKI has secured numerous patents on diamond setting techniques and innovations in displays for loose polished stones and jewelry.

Missing diamonds and litigation

On May 17, 2010, Lazare Kaplan sued various Lloyd's of London syndicates and European insurers for $640 million in damages arising from the disappearance of diamonds. The lawsuit alleges that the insurers breached two "all risk" New York property insurance policies.

In 2011, Lazare filed a US$1.5 billion Racketeer Influenced and Corrupt Organizations Act (RICO) complaint in the US against KBC Bank, the largest bank in Belgium, after defaulting on a $45 million loan from KBC in a case about an alleged conspiracy to steal diamonds and money. According to KBC Bank's lawyers, Lazare chairman Maurice Tempelsman was involved, as was Erez Daleyot, described as "a notorious diamond dealer who once controlled a third of all trade in diamonds". In 2019, KBC won a motion to dismiss the US case, considered to be a major win for the bank. Litigation in Belgium between KBC and Lazare continued.

A summary of the complex case involving LKI and KBC Bank was included in a 2020 KBC Base Prospectus, up to proceedings pending before the Belgian Court of Cassation initiated by LKI on 2 April 2019. After ten years of litigation the Company Court of Antwerp, section Antwerp had not been able to decide on the merits of the case.

LKI has been suspended from trading on the American Stock Exchange since September 2009 and has not filed quarterly or annual reports with the U.S. Securities and Exchange Commission (SEC) since early 2009.

Ethical standards 

LKI supports (and has helped develop) policies that prohibit the trade in conflict diamonds, prevent money laundering, combat the financing of terrorism, and promote transparency, fair dealing and disclosure throughout the diamond pipeline. It is LKI's strict policy to clearly identify its prospective suppliers and its customers before entering into any business transaction.

Kimberley Process Certification Scheme – LKI actively participated in the inaugural meeting of diamond industry stakeholders in Kimberley, South Africa, in May 2000, and participated in all subsequent deliberations that led to the January 2003 adoption of the KPCS and its system of controls over rough diamond trading, intended to combat the trade in conflict diamonds. LKI has a zero tolerance policy with regards to conflict diamonds and will not import or export rough diamonds without an accompanying Kimberley Process Certificate of origin.

World Diamond Council Industry Self-Regulation – Established in conjunction with the KPCS, the WDC has established a system of buyer-seller warranties to extend the reach and effectiveness of the KPCS throughout the entire diamond pipeline. LKI trades only with companies that provide such warranties, guaranteeing the conflict-free origin of the diamonds on their invoices. All sales and consignments of LKI diamonds are accompanied by LKI's own warranty statement. This flow of warranties in and warranties out is audited and reconciled on an annual basis by LKI's financial auditors.

Zero tolerance for conflict diamonds – LKI follows a policy of zero tolerance for conflict diamonds as defined by United Nations General Assembly Resolution 55/56 of 2000. The LKI system of controls was instituted before the existence of this UN Resolution, and received special commendation from the UN for its contribution to stemming the flow of conflict diamonds. All of LKI's rough diamond buyers are required to sign and abide by a written code of ethical diamond trading conduct as a condition of continued employment.

Trade association membership – LKI and its officers are members of a wide variety of diamond and jewelry industry associations including, but not limited to, the American Gem Society, the Jewelers Vigilance Committee, the Jewelers Board of Trade, the Diamond Manufacturers and Importers Association, the Jewelers Credit Interchange Group, the Jewelers Security Alliance, the New York Diamond Dealers Club, and the Council for Responsible Jewelry Practices.

Best Practice Principles Assurance Program (a Diamond Trading Company program) – LKI subscribes to and is compliant with this program, which was developed to demonstrate to supply chain partners, consumers and other interested stakeholders that the exploration, extraction, sorting, cutting and polishing of diamonds, and the manufacture and sale of diamond jewelry is undertaken in a professionally, ethically, socially and environmentally friendly and accountable way.

Corporate citizenship policies 

LKI supports and implements, within the scope of its influence, a set of core values in the areas of human rights, development, labor standards and environmental sustainability.

Social Accountability International (SAI) – LKI's primary factory in Puerto Rico was the first diamond polishing factory in the world to be certified by SAI for compliance with the highest standard of workplace norms, as measured by SAI's internationally recognized social accountability measuring system (SA8000). The SA8000 standard and verification system provides a credible, comprehensive and efficient measure of humane workplace practices and public responsibility. 

UN Global Compact – In 2000, LKI became a founding member of the United Nations Global Compact, intended to support universal environmental and social principles.

Global Sullivan Principles – LKI endorses and subscribes to the Global Sullivan Principles, a code of conduct designed to promote social justice, human rights and economic opportunity.

References

External links 

Description of LKI in the DTC Directory of Sightholders: 
 El Taller de Corte y Pulido de Diamantes: otra joya en la historia de Ponce: La llamada 'Fábrica de Diamantes' era, como el mismo prestigioso mineral con el que trabajaban, algo deslumbrante, único hasta aquel momento, en un Puerto Rico fundamentalmente agrario y campesino. José Enrique Ayoroa Santaliz. La Perla del Sur. 29 December 2020.

Companies based in New York City
Manufacturing companies established in 1903
Diamond dealers
Diamond cutting
American jewellers